An aglet or aiglet is a small sheath, often made of plastic or metal, attached at each end of a shoelace, a cord, or a drawstring. An aglet keeps the fibers of the lace or cord from unraveling; its firmness and narrow profile make it easier to hold and easier to feed through  eyelets, lugs, or other lacing guides.

Etymology

History
Aglets were originally made of metal, glass, or stone, and many were very ornamental. Wealthy people in the Roman era would have their aglets made out of precious metals such as brass or silver. 

Before the invention of buttons, they were used on the ends of the ribbons used to fasten clothing together. Sometimes they were formed into small figures. Shakespeare calls this type of figure an "aglet baby" in The Taming of the Shrew.

According to Huffington Post editor James Cave, "The history of the aglet’s evolution is a little knotty—many sources credit it as being popularized by an English inventor named Harvey Kennedy who is said to have earned $2.5 million off the modern shoelace in the 1790s."

Today, the clear plastic aglets on the end of shoelaces are put there by special machines. The machines wrap plastic tape around the end of new shoelaces and use heat or chemicals to melt the plastic onto the shoelace and bond the plastic to itself.

Variety
There is a subtle distinction between aglets, which are generally functional, and aiguillettes, which are generally decorative. Aiguillettes usually appear at the end of decorative cords, such as bolo ties and the cords on military dress uniforms. 

Shoe companies often produce their own shoelaces, for which they manufacture aglets. Many companies prefer to add metal sheaths over plastic aglets for better durability. Some may also add logos or pictures.

See also

 Aiguillette
 Ferrule
 Whipping knot

References

Parts of clothing
Footwear accessories